
The following is a list of recurring Saturday Night Live sketches, organized by the season and date in which the sketch first appeared.
For an alphabetical list, see Recurring Saturday Night Live characters and sketches (listed alphabetically).

1975–1976

1976–1977

 Mr. Mike's Least-Loved Bedtime Tales (Michael O'Donoghue) – October 30, 1976
 Consumer Probe (Dan Aykroyd, Jane Curtin, Candice Bergen) – December 11, 1976
 Coneheads (Dan Aykroyd, Jane Curtin, Laraine Newman) – January 15, 1977
 E. Buzz Miller and Christie Christina (Dan Aykroyd, Laraine Newman) – January 22, 1977
 Rhonda Weiss (Gilda Radner) – January 29, 1977
 Leonard Pinth-Garnell (Dan Aykroyd) – March 12, 1977
 Colleen Fernman (Gilda Radner) – April 9, 1977
 Nick The Lounge Singer (Bill Murray) – April 16, 1977
 Debbie Doody (Gilda Radner) – April 16, 1977
 Shower Mike with Richard Herkiman (Bill Murray) May 21, 1977

1977–1978

 The Festrunk Brothers (Wild and Crazy Guys) (Dan Aykroyd, Steve Martin) – September 24, 1977
 The Franken and Davis Show (Al Franken, Tom Davis) – September 24, 1977
 The Ex-Police (Dan Aykroyd, Bill Murray) – October 15, 1977
 Judy Miller (Gilda Radner) – October 29, 1977
 Roseanne Roseannadanna (Gilda Radner) – January 21, 1978
 Olympia Cafe (Cheeseburger, Cheeseburger) (John Belushi, Dan Aykroyd, Laraine Newman, Bill Murray) – January 28, 1978
 The Nerds (Lisa Loopner) (Gilda Radner, featuring Bill Murray as Todd, and Jane Curtin as Mrs. Loopner) – January 28, 1978
 Lester Crackfield (Al Franken) – February 18, 1978
 Point/Counterpoint (Jane Curtin, Dan Aykroyd) – March 25, 1978
 The Blues Brothers (Dan Aykroyd, John Belushi) – April 22, 1978
 Theodoric of York, Medieval Barber (Steve Martin) – April 22, 1978
 Father Guido Sarducci (Don Novello) – May 13, 1978

1978–1979

 Honker the Homeless Man (Bill Murray) – October 14, 1978
 The Mall (Scotch Boutique, D&R Men's Stylists, Barry White's Big and Tall, etc.) – October 14, 1978
 Woman to Woman (Gilda Radner) – October 21, 1978
 Uncle Roy (Buck Henry) – November 11, 1978
 St. Mickey's Knights Of Columbus – November 11, 1978
 Chico Escuela (Garrett Morris) – November 11, 1978
 Telepsychic (Dan Aykroyd) – December 9, 1978
 Candy Slice (Gilda Radner) – December 9, 1978
 The Widettes (Jane Curtin, Dan Aykroyd, John Belushi, Gilda Radner) – December 16, 1978
 Miles Cowperthwaite (Michael Palin) – January 27, 1979
 Dick Lanky (Bill Murray) – February 17, 1979
 Rosa Santangelo (Gilda Radner) – May 19, 1979

1979–1980

 Tom Clay (Harry Shearer) – October 20, 1979
 The Bel-Airabs (Don Novello, Bill Murray, Jane Curtin, Gilda Radner, Laraine Newman) – December 8, 1979
 Big Vic Ricker (Harry Shearer) – January 26, 1980
 Iris De Flaminio (Jane Curtin) – April 5, 1980

1980–1981

 Vickie & Debbie (Gail Matthius, Denny Dillon) – November 15, 1980
 What's It All About (Gilbert Gottfried, Denny Dillon) – November 15, 1980
 Paulie Herman (Joe Piscopo) – December 6, 1980
 Raheem Abdul Muhammed (Eddie Murphy) – December 6, 1980
 Mary Louise (Denny Dillon) – December 6, 1980
 Nadine and Rowena (Denny Dillon, Gail Matthius) – December 13, 1980
 The Livelys (Charles Rocket, Gail Matthius) – January 17, 1981
 Mister Robinson's Neighborhood (Eddie Murphy) – February 21, 1981
 I Married A Monkey (Tim Kazurinsky) – April 11, 1981
 Frank & Papa (Tim Kazurinsky, Tony Rosato) – April 11, 1981

1981–1982

 A Few Minutes with Andy Rooney (Joe Piscopo) – October 3, 1981
 Tyrone Green, Prose and Cons (Eddie Murphy) – October 3, 1981
 The Bizzaro World (Tim Kazurinsky, Mary Gross, Christine Ebersole, Robin Duke, Joe Piscopo, Tony Rosato) - October 10, 1981
 Buckwheat (Eddie Murphy) – October 10, 1981
 Paulette Clooney (Robin Duke) – October 10, 1981
 Velvet Jones (Eddie Murphy) – October 17, 1981
 Vic Salukin (Tony Rosato) – October 31, 1981
 Pudge & Solomon (Joe Piscopo, Eddie Murphy) – January 30, 1982
 Dr. Jack Badofsky (Tim Kazurinsky) – March 20, 1982
 Gumby (Eddie Murphy) – March 27, 1982
 The Whiners (Joe Piscopo, Robin Duke) – April 10, 1982

1982–1983

 April May June (Julia Louis-Dreyfus) – September 25, 1982
 Mrs. T. (Robin Duke) – October 2, 1982
 Marvin & Celeste (Tim Kazurinsky, Mary Gross) – October 2, 1982
 Alfalfa (Mary Gross) – November 13, 1982
 Havnagootiim Vishnuuerheer (Tim Kazurinsky) – December 4, 1982
 Siobhan Cahill (Mary Gross) – January 22, 1983
 Dr. Ruth Westheimer (Mary Gross) – January 29, 1983
 Dion's Hairstyling (Eddie Murphy, Joe Piscopo) – February 19, 1983
 Patti Lynn Hunnsacker (Julia Louis-Dreyfus) – February 5, 1983

1983–1984

 Dwight MacNamara (Gary Kroeger) – November 12, 1983
 Hello, Trudy! (James Belushi, Julia Louis-Dreyfus) – December 10, 1983
 El Dorko (Gary Kroeger) – January 28, 1984
 Worthington Clotman (Tim Kazurinsky) – January 28, 1984
 Wayne Huevos (Tim Kazurinsky) – February 18, 1984

1984–1985

 Ed Grimley (Martin Short) – October 6, 1984
 Rich Hall's Election Report (Rich Hall) – October 6, 1984
 Lawrence Orback (Martin Short) – October 6, 1984
 Lew Goldman (Billy Crystal) – October 13, 1984
 Tippi Turtle (Christopher Guest) – October 13, 1984
 Willie & Frankie ("Don't ya hate it when...?") (Billy Crystal, Christopher Guest) – October 20, 1984
 Buddy Young, Jr. (Billy Crystal) – October 20, 1984
 Fernando's Hideaway (Billy Crystal) – November 3, 1984
 The Joe Franklin Show (Billy Crystal) – November 10, 1984
 Jackie Rogers Jr. (Martin Short) – November 10, 1984
 Chi Chi & Consuela (Mary Gross, Julia Louis-Dreyfus) – November 10, 1984
 Nathan Thurm (Martin Short) – November 17, 1984
 Paul Harvey (Rich Hall) – November 17, 1984
 Harry Shearer (Christopher Guest) – December 8, 1984
 Ricky & Phil (Billy Crystal, Christopher Guest) – January 19, 1985
 That White Guy (James Belushi) – February 2, 1985
 Robert Latta (Rich Hall) – February 2, 1985

1985–1986

 Cabrini Green Jackson (Danitra Vance) – November 9, 1985
 The Jones Brothers (Damon Wayans, Anthony Michael Hall) – November 9, 1985
 The Limits of the Imagination (Randy Quaid) – November 9, 1985
 The Pat Stevens Show (Nora Dunn) – November 16, 1985
 Craig Sundberg, Idiot Savant (Anthony Michael Hall) – November 16, 1985
 Tommy Flanagan, the Pathological Liar (Jon Lovitz) – November 16, 1985
 Master Thespian (Jon Lovitz) – December 7, 1985
 The Rudy Randolphs (Randy Quaid, Robert Downey, Jr.) – December 7, 1985
 The Stand-Ups (Tom Hanks, Jon Lovitz, Damon Wayans, Dennis Miller) – December 14, 1985
 That Black Girl (Danitra Vance) – January 18, 1986
 Vinnie Barber (Jon Lovitz) – January 18, 1986
 Mephistopheles (Jon Lovitz) – January 25, 1986
 The Big Picture (A. Whitney Brown) – February 8, 1986
 Babette (Nora Dunn) – February 15, 1986
 The Further Adventures of Biff and Salena (Jon Lovitz, Joan Cusack) – February 22, 1986
 Actors of Film (Nora Dunn, Robert Downey, Jr.) – March 22, 1986

1986–1987

 Marge Keister (Jan Hooks) – October 11, 1986
 The Church Lady (Dana Carvey) – October 11, 1986
 Mr. Subliminal (Kevin Nealon) – October 11, 1986
 Derek Stevens ("She choppin' broccoli...") (Dana Carvey) – October 11, 1986
 The Sweeney Sisters (Jan Hooks, Nora Dunn, Marc Shaiman) – October 18, 1986
 Instant Coffee with Bill Smith (Kevin Nealon) – October 18, 1986
 The Two Sammies (Dana Carvey, Kevin Nealon) – November 8, 1986
 Miss Connie's Fable Nook (Jan Hooks, Dana Carvey, Dennis Miller, Kevin Nealon) – November 8, 1986
 Chick Hazzard/Eddie Spimozo (Phil Hartman, Jon Lovitz) – November 15, 1986
 Ching Chang (Dana Carvey) – November 15, 1986
 The NFL Today (Phil Hartman, Kevin Nealon) – January 24, 1987
 Mace (Phil Hartman) – January 24, 1987
 Nightline (Dana Carvey) – February 14, 1987
 Discover (Phil Hartman) – February 28, 1987
 President Dexter (Charlton Heston) – March 28, 1987

1987–1988

 Pumping Up with Hans & Franz (Dana Carvey, Kevin Nealon) – October 17, 1987
 Dennis Miller (Dana Carvey) – December 19, 1987
 Tonto, Tarzan & Frankenstein's Monster (Jon Lovitz, Kevin Nealon, Phil Hartman) – December 19, 1987
 Learning To Feel (Nora Dunn) – January 23, 1988
 Girl Watchers (Tom Hanks, Jon Lovitz) – February 20, 1988

1988–1989

 Mr. Short-Term Memory (Tom Hanks) – October 8, 1988
 Celebrity Restaurant (Dana Carvey) – December 3, 1988
 Plug Away (Jon Lovitz) – December 10, 1988
 Tony Trailer (Kevin Nealon) – January 21, 1989
 Stuart Rankin, All Things Scottish (Mike Myers) – January 28, 1989
 Grumpy Old Man (Dana Carvey) – February 11, 1989
 Wayne's World (Dana Carvey, Mike Myers) – February 18, 1989
 Cooking with the Anal Retentive Chef (Phil Hartman) – April 1, 1989
 Tales Of Ribaldry (Jon Lovitz) – April 1, 1989
 Sprockets (Mike Myers) – April 15, 1989
 Lothar of the Hill People (Mike Myers, Phil Hartman, Jon Lovitz) – April 15, 1989
 Toonces, The Driving Cat (Dana Carvey, Victoria Jackson) – May 20, 1989

1989–1990

 Lank Thompson (Mike Myers) – October 21, 1989
 The Tonight Show (Dana Carvey) – October 28, 1989
 Lyle the Effeminate Heterosexual (Dana Carvey) – November 11, 1989
 Annoying Man (Jon Lovitz) – November 11, 1989
 Singing Cowboys (Dana Carvey, Phil Hartman) – November 11, 1989
 Hanukkah Harry (Jon Lovitz) – December 16, 1989
 The Continental (Christopher Walken) – January 20, 1990
 Middle-Aged Man (Mike Myers)– April 21, 1990

1990–1991

 Larry Roman the Talent Scout (Dana Carvey) – September 29, 1990
 Simon (Mike Myers) – November 10, 1990
 The Dark Side with Nat X (Chris Rock, Chris Farley) – November 10, 1990
 The Doormen (Rob Schneider, Kevin Nealon) – November 10, 1990
 Pat (Julia Sweeney) – December 1, 1990
 Uri (Sabra) (Tom Hanks) – December 8, 1990
 Bill Swerski's Superfans (Joe Mantegna, George Wendt, Robert Smigel, Mike Myers, Chris Farley) – January 12, 1991
 I'm Chillin' (Chris Rock, Chris Farley) – January 12, 1991
 Deep Thoughts (Jack Handey) – January 19, 1991
 The Elevator Fans (Dana Carvey, Kevin Nealon) – January 19, 1991
 The Richmeister (Copy Room Guy) (Rob Schneider) – January 19, 1991
 Coffee Talk with Linda Richman (Mike Myers) – January 19, 1991
 Daily Affirmation with Stuart Smalley (Al Franken) – February 9, 1991
 Frank Gannon, P.I. P.I. (Kevin Nealon) – April 13, 1991

1991–1992

 Tales From The Barbecue (Tim Meadows, Chris Rock) – September 28, 1991
 Zoraida the NBC Page (Ellen Cleghorne) – September 28, 1991
 The Chris Farley Show (Chris Farley) – October 4, 1991
 Queen Shenequa (Ellen Cleghorne) – October 26, 1991
 Mark Strobel (Chris Farley) – November 2, 1991
 Unfrozen Caveman Lawyer (Phil Hartman) – November 23, 1991
 Dick Clark's Receptionist (David Spade) – December 7, 1991
 Theatre Stories (Mike Myers, Julia Sweeney, Dana Carvey) – December 14, 1991
 Jan Brady (Melanie Hutsell) – January 11, 1992
 Delta Delta Delta (Melanie Hutsell, Siobhan Fallon Hogan, Beth Cahill) – January 11, 1992
 Cajun Man (Adam Sandler) – February 8, 1992
 The Sensitive Naked Man (Rob Schneider) – February 8, 1992
 Buster Jenkins (Chris Rock) – February 15, 1992
 Susan the Transsexual (Phil Hartman) – February 15, 1992
 Opera Man (Adam Sandler) – April 18, 1992

1992–1993

 Tiny Elvis (Nicolas Cage/Rob Schneider) – September 26, 1992
 Larry King Live (Kevin Nealon) – October 3, 1992
 Hollywood Minute (David Spade) – October 3, 1992
 Audience McGee (Adam Sandler) – October 24, 1992
 Hank Fielding (Robert Smigel) – November 14, 1992
 Tony Vallencourt (Adam Sandler) – December 12, 1992
 Orgasm Guy (Rob Schneider) – December 12, 1992
 Gap Girls (Adam Sandler, David Spade, Chris Farley) – January 9, 1993
 Sassy's Sassiest Boys (Phil Hartman) – February 6, 1993
 Canteen Boy (Adam Sandler) – March 13, 1993
 Hub's Gyros ("You like-a the juice?") (Rob Schneider, Robert Smigel, Chris Farley, Adam Sandler) – April 10, 1993
 Bennett Brauer (Chris Farley) – April 10, 1993
 Matt Foley (Chris Farley) – May 8, 1993

1993–1994

 Milton (Office Space) – September 25, 1993
 Out Of Africa ("You put your weed in there!") (Rob Schneider) – September 25, 1993
 The Denise Show (Adam Sandler) – October 2, 1993
 Ike Turner (Tim Meadows) – October 2, 1993
 Christopher Walken's Psychic Network (Jay Mohr) – October 9, 1993
 Karl's Video (David Spade) – October 9, 1993
 Phillip the Hyper Hypo (Mike Myers) – November 20, 1993
 The Herlihy Boy (Adam Sandler, Chris Farley) – December 4, 1993
 Stevie Siskin (David Spade) – February 19, 1994
 Total Bastard Airlines (David Spade) – March 19, 1994
 Captain Jim & Pedro (Tim Meadows, Adam Sandler) – April 9, 1994

1994–1995

 Gil Graham (Adam Sandler) – September 24, 1994
 Religious Cult (Adam Sandler, David Spade) – October 15, 1994
 Good Morning Brooklyn (Jay Mohr) – November 12, 1994
 Scottish Soccer Hooligan Weekly (Mike Myers, Mark McKinney) – January 21, 1995
 Perspectives with Lionel Osbourne (Tim Meadows) – January 21, 1995
 Zagat's (Chris Farley, Adam Sandler) – February 25, 1995
 Mighty Mack Blues (John Goodman) – March 25, 1995
 Melanie the Babysitter (Mark McKinney) – April 15, 1995

1995–1996

1996–1997

 The Ambiguously Gay Duo (a cartoon by Robert Smigel) – September 28, 1996
 Mr. Peepers (Chris Kattan) – September 28, 1996
 Kincaid (Ana Gasteyer) – September 28, 1996
 Gene, the Ex-Convict (Colin Quinn) – October 5, 1996
 Harry Caray (Will Ferrell) – October 19, 1996
 The Quiet Storm (Tim Meadows) – October 19, 1996
 The Culps (Ana Gasteyer, Will Ferrell) – November 2, 1996
 The Delicious Dish (Ana Gasteyer, Molly Shannon, Rachel Dratch, Alec Baldwin) – November 16, 1996
 Shopping At Home Network (Will Ferrell, Chris Kattan) – November 16, 1996
 Cinder Calhoun (Ana Gasteyer) – November 23, 1996
 Celebrity Jeopardy! (Will Ferrell, Darrell Hammond, Norm Macdonald, and various others) – December 7, 1996
 Janet Reno's Dance Party (Will Ferrell) – January 11, 1997
 The X-Presidents (a cartoon by Robert Smigel) – January 11, 1997
 The Atteburys (Ana Gasteyer, Mark McKinney/Will Ferrell) – January 11, 1997
 Wong & Owens, Ex-Porn Stars (Jim Breuer, Tracy Morgan) – January 18, 1997
 The Zimmermans (Chris Kattan, Cheri Oteri) – February 15, 1997
 The DeMarco Brothers (Chris Parnell, Chris Kattan) – March 15, 1997
 Dominican Lou (Tracy Morgan) – March 22, 1997
 Goth Talk (Molly Shannon, Chris Kattan, Jim Breuer) – April 12, 1997
 Collette Reardon (Cheri Oteri) – May 10, 1997
 Space, The Infinite Frontier (Will Ferrell) – May 17, 1997

1997–1998

 Leon Phelps, The Ladies Man (Tim Meadows) – October 4, 1997
 Issues with Jeffrey Kaufman (Jim Breuer) – October 18, 1997
 Mango (Chris Kattan) – October 18, 1997
 Morning Latte (Cheri Oteri, Will Ferrell) – October 25, 1997
 Southern Gals (Ana Gasteyer, Cheri Oteri, Molly Shannon) – November 15, 1997
 Tiger Beat's Ultra Super Duper Dreamy Love Show (Ana Gasteyer, Cheri Oteri, Molly Shannon, Sarah Michelle Gellar) – January 15, 1998
 Gunner Olsen (Jim Breuer) – March 7, 1998
 The Céline Dion Show (Ana Gasteyer) – March 7, 1998
 Pretty Living (Molly Shannon, Ana Gasteyer) – March 14, 1998
 Terrence Maddox, Nude Model (Will Ferrell) – March 14, 1998

1998–1999

 Jingleheimer Junction (Will Ferrell, Cameron Diaz, Horatio Sanz, Ana Gasteyer, Tim Meadows) – September 26, 1998
 Hello Dolly (Ana Gasteyer) – October 3, 1998
 The How Do You Say? Ah, Yes, Show (Chris Kattan) – October 17, 1998
 Dog Show (Will Ferrell, Molly Shannon) – December 5, 1998
 Pimp Chat (Tracy Morgan, Tim Meadows) – December 5, 1998
 Skeeter (Darrell Hammond) – January 9, 1999
 Brian Fellow's Safari Planet (Tracy Morgan) – January 16, 1999
 7 Degrees Celsius (Will Ferrell, Chris Kattan, Chris Parnell, Jimmy Fallon, Horatio Sanz) – January 16, 1999
 Chet Harper (Ray Romano) – March 13, 1999

1999–2000

 The Boston Teens (Jimmy Fallon, Rachel Dratch, Horatio Sanz, Ben Affleck) – November 13, 1999
 Nadeen (Cheri Oteri) – November 13, 1999
 Nick Burns, Your Company's Computer Guy (Jimmy Fallon) – November 20, 1999
 Jacob Silj (Will Ferrell) – December 4, 1999
 Sally O'Malley (Molly Shannon) – December 11, 1999
 Jasper Hahn (Horatio Sanz) – January 8, 2000
 Dr. Beamen (Will Ferrell) – January 15, 2000
 Joy Lipton (Cheri Oteri) – February 12, 2000
 The Bloder Brothers (Chris Parnell, Jimmy Fallon) – February 12, 2000
 Woodrow the Homeless Man (Tracy Morgan) – May 18, 2000

2000–2001

 Gemini's Twin (Maya Rudolph, Ana Gasteyer) – November 4, 2000
 Jeannie Darcy (Molly Shannon) – November 18, 2000
 Rap Street (Jerry Minor, Horatio Sanz) – November 18, 2000
 Veronica & Co. (Molly Shannon, Chris Parnell) – December 9, 2000
 Jarret's Room (Jimmy Fallon, Horatio Sanz, Seth Meyers, Jeff Richards) – December 16, 2000
 Season's Greetings From Saturday Night Live (Christmas is Number One) (Horatio Sanz, Jimmy Fallon, Chris Kattan, Tracy Morgan) – December 16, 2000
 Jeffrey's (Jimmy Fallon, Will Ferrell) – February 17, 2001
 The Lovers (Will Ferrell, Rachel Dratch) – February 24, 2001
 Wake Up Wakefield! (Maya Rudolph, Rachel Dratch, Jimmy Fallon, Horatio Sanz) – March 17, 2001

2001–2002

 Donatella Versace (Maya Rudolph) – September 29, 2001
 Gay Hitler (Chris Kattan) – October 13, 2001
 Nicole, The Girl With No Gaydar (Rachel Dratch) – November 3, 2001
 America Undercover (Chris Kattan, Amy Poehler) – November 3, 2001
 Drunk Girl (Jeff Richards) – December 8, 2001
 Astronaut Jones (Tracy Morgan) – February 2, 2002
 The Leather Man (Jimmy Fallon) – February 2, 2002
 Amber, the One-Legged Hypoglycemic (Amy Poehler) – March 2, 2002
 The Ferey Muhtar Talk Show (Horatio Sanz) – March 16, 2002

2002–2003

 Fericito (Fred Armisen) – October 5, 2002
 Merv the Perv (Chris Parnell) – October 12, 2002
 Tim Calhoun (Will Forte) – October 19, 2002
 Top O' the Morning (Seth Meyers, Jimmy Fallon) – October 19, 2002
 Z105 with Joey Mack (Jimmy Fallon) – November 2, 2002
 Baby K (Jeff Richards) – November 2, 2002
 The Falconer (Will Forte) – November 9, 2002
 Glenda Goodwin (Maya Rudolph) – November 9, 2002
 Terrye Funck (Chris Parnell) – January 11, 2003
 Rialto Grande (Chris Kattan, Fred Armisen, Jimmy Fallon, and others) – January 18, 2003
 Club Traxx (Maya Rudolph, Fred Armisen) – February 8, 2003
 The Kelly Brothers (Fred Armisen, Will Forte) – February 8, 2003
 Pranksters (Seth Meyers) – February 22, 2003
 Don's Apothecary (Horatio Sanz) – March 8, 2003
 Adult Students (Tracy Morgan, Fred Armisen, Rachel Dratch, Horatio Sanz) – March 15, 2003

2003–2004

 The Barry Gibb Talk Show (Jimmy Fallon, Justin Timberlake) – October 11, 2003
 Mascots (Justin Timberlake) – October 11, 2003
 Billy Smith (Fred Armisen) – October 18, 2003
 Starkishka & Appreciante (Finesse Mitchell, Maya Rudolph) – October 18, 2003
 Spy Glass (Amy Poehler, Seth Meyers) – November 1, 2003
 Terrell and his wife (J. B. Smoove, Paula Pell) – November 1, 2003
 Dave "Zinger" Clinger (Seth Meyers) – November 15, 2003
 Abe Scheinwald (Rachel Dratch) – November 15, 2003
 Appalachian Emergency Room (Seth Meyers, Chris Parnell, Darrell Hammond, Amy Poehler and various others) – January 10, 2004
 The Prince Show (Fred Armisen, Maya Rudolph) – February 14, 2004
 ¡Show Biz Grande Explosion! (Fred Armisen as Fericito (see 2002–2003), Horatio Sanz) – March 6, 2004
 Debbie Downer (Rachel Dratch) – May 1, 2004
 Kaitlin & Rick (Amy Poehler, Horatio Sanz) – May 1, 2004
 Jorge Rodriguez (Horatio Sanz) – May 1, 2004
 Pat 'N Patti Silviac (Horatio Sanz, Maya Rudolph) – May 15, 2004

2004–2005

 Bear City – October 23, 2004
 Carol! (Horatio Sanz) – December 11, 2004
 Phoebe and her Giant Pets (Rachel Dratch, Fred Armisen) – November 13, 2004
 Noony and Nuni Schoener, Art Dealers (Fred Armisen, Maya Rudolph, Chris Parnell) – January 15, 2005
 The Lundford Twins Feel Good Variety Hour (Fred Armisen, Amy Poehler) – January 22, 2005
 Gays In Space (Fred Armisen, Chris Parnell, Maya Rudolph, Kenan Thompson) – February 12, 2005

2005–2006

 Voice Recording Woman (Rachel Dratch) – October 8, 2005
 Deep House Dish (Kenan Thompson, Rachel Dratch, Andy Samberg) – November 19, 2005
 Vincent Price's Holiday Special (Bill Hader) – November 19, 2005
 Target Lady (Kristen Wiig) – December 3, 2005
 Two A-Holes (Kristen Wiig, Jason Sudeikis) – December 17, 2005
 Mike and Lexie (Fred Armisen, Scarlett Johansson) – January 14, 2006
 Natalie Raps (Natalie Portman, Andy Samberg) – March 4, 2006
 Introverts' Night Out (Will Forte, Kristen Wiig) – April 15, 2006

2006–2007

 Jon Bovi (Will Forte, Jason Sudeikis) – October 7, 2006
 Two Gay Guys (Fred Armisen, Bill Hader) – October 28, 2006
 Blizzard Man (Andy Samberg) – November 18, 2006
 Aunt Linda (Kristen Wiig) – December 2, 2006
 Dick In A Box Guys (Andy Samberg, Justin Timberlake) – December 16, 2006
 Bronx Beat (Amy Poehler, Maya Rudolph) – January 13, 2007
 MacGruber (Will Forte) – January 20, 2007
 The Dakota Fanning Show (Amy Poehler, Kenan Thompson) – February 3, 2007
 Song Memories – February 24, 2007
 La Rivista Della Televisione (Bill Hader, Fred Armisen) – March 17, 2007
 Penelope (Kristen Wiig) – March 24, 2007

2007–2008

 Nicholas Fehn (Fred Armisen) – October 13, 2007
 Jean K. Jean (Kenan Thompson) – March 8, 2008
 The Suze Orman Show (Kristen Wiig) – March 15, 2008
 Adam Grossman (Jonah Hill) – March 15, 2008
 Sue (Kristen Wiig) – April 5, 2008
 The Cougar Den (Cameron Diaz, Amy Poehler, Kristen Wiig, Casey Wilson) – April 12, 2008
 Judy Grimes (Kristen Wiig) – April 12, 2008
 Scared Straight (Kenan Thompson, Jason Sudeikis, Andy Samberg, Bill Hader, Bobby Moynihan) – May 10, 2008

2008–2009

 Googie Rene (Kenan Thompson) – September 27, 2008
 The Lawrence Welk Show (Fred Armisen, Kristen Wiig) – October 4, 2008
 Jeff Montgomery (Will Forte) – October 25, 2008
 Stefon (Bill Hader) – November 1, 2008
 Grady Wilson (Kenan Thompson) – November 1, 2008
 The Vogelchecks (Fred Armisen, Kristen Wiig, Bill Hader) – November 15, 2008
 Dateline (Bill Hader) – November 22, 2008
 Shana (Kristen Wiig) – December 6, 2008
 Gilly (Kristen Wiig) – January 17, 2009
 Angie Tempura (Michaela Watkins) – February 14, 2009
 Game Time With Randy And Greg (Bill Hader, Kenan Thompson) – March 7, 2009
 Hamilton (Will Forte) – May 16, 2009

2009–2010

 Pete Twinkle and Greg Stink (Will Forte, Jason Sudeikis) – October 10, 2009
 What Up with That? (Kenan Thompson) – October 17, 2009
 Hollywood Dish (Bill Hader, Kristen Wiig) – November 7, 2009
 Roger Brush (Fred Armisen) – November 21, 2009
 Secret Word (Bill Hader, Kristen Wiig) – November 21, 2009
 Kickspit Underground Festival (Jason Sudeikis, Nasim Pedrad, Bobby Moynihan) – December 5, 2009
 Tina Tina Cheneuse (Jenny Slate) – December 12, 2009
 Garth and Kat (Fred Armisen, Kristen Wiig) – December 19, 2009
 The Manuel Ortiz Show (Fred Armisen) – December 19, 2009
 Bedelia (Nasim Pedrad) – April 10, 2010
 The Devil (Jason Sudeikis) – April 10, 2010
 Mort Mort Feingold - Accountant for the Stars (Andy Samberg) – April 17, 2010
 Anthony Crispino (Bobby Moynihan) – April 17, 2010

2010–2011

 The Miley Cyrus Show (Vanessa Bayer) – October 2, 2010
 Les Jeunes de Paris (Taran Killam) – October 23, 2010
 "Sex" Ed Vincent (Paul Brittain) – October 23, 2010
 Laura Parsons (Vanessa Bayer) – November 13, 2010
 The Essentials with Robert Osborne (Jason Sudeikis) – November 20, 2010
 Visiting the Queen (Fred Armisen, Bill Hader) – November 20, 2010
 Herb Welch (Bill Hader) – November 20, 2010
 Julian Assange (Bill Hader) – December 4, 2010
 Principal Daniel Frye (Jay Pharoah) – December 11, 2010
 What's That Name? (Bill Hader) – December 11, 2010
 Merryville Carnival Ride (Bill Hader, Taran Killam, other) – January 8, 2011
 Triangle Sally (Kristen Wiig) – January 8, 2011
 Jacob the Bar Mitzvah Boy (Vanessa Bayer) – January 15, 2011
 The Original Kings of Catchphrase Comedy (Kenan Thompson, Paul Brittain, Bobby Moynihan, Seth Meyers) – March 12, 2011
 Get in the Cage! (Andy Samberg) – April 2, 2011
 The Best of Both Worlds (Andy Samberg) – April 9, 2011
 Bongo's Clown Room (Jason Sudeikis) – April 9, 2011
 Dictator's Two Best Friends From Growing Up (Fred Armisen, Vanessa Bayer) – May 7, 2011

2011–2012

 Movie Screen Tests (Various) – September 24, 2011
 J-Pop America Fun Time Now (Taran Killam, Vanessa Bayer, Jason Sudeikis) – October 15, 2011
 Lord Wyndemere (Paul Brittain) – October 15, 2011
 Getting Freaky with Cee-Lo Green! (Kenan Thompson) – November 5, 2011
 We're Going to Make Technology Hump (Andy Samberg) – November 12, 2011
 Drunk Uncle (Bobby Moynihan) – December 3, 2011
 Janet Peckinpah (Bobby Moynihan) – February 4, 2012
 Bein' Quirky with Zooey Deschanel (Abby Elliott, Taran Killam) – February 11, 2012
 How's He Doing? (Kenan Thompson, Jay Pharoah) – February 19, 2012
 B108 FM (Taran Killam, Bobby Moynihan) – March 4, 2012
 The Californians (Fred Armisen, Bill Hader, Kristen Wiig, Vanessa Bayer) – April 14, 2012

2012–2013

 Puppet Class (Bill Hader) – September 15, 2012
 The Girl You Wish You Hadn't Started A Conversation With At A Party (Cecily Strong) – September 27, 2012
 Regine (Fred Armisen) – October 6, 2012
 Kirby (Bobby Moynihan) – October 6, 2012
 Last Call (Sheila Sovage) (Kate McKinnon, Kenan Thompson) – November 3, 2012
 Girlfriends Talk Show (Aidy Bryant, Cecily Strong) – November 10, 2012
 Niff and Dana (Bobby Moynihan, Cecily Strong) – November 10, 2012
 The Ellen Show (Kate McKinnon) – November 10, 2012
 Maine Justice (Jason Sudeikis) – December 8, 2012
 Former Porn Star Commercials (Vanessa Bayer, Cecily Strong) – December 8, 2012
 Eddie (Taran Killam) – February 9, 2013
 Olya Povlatsky (Kate McKinnon) – February 16, 2013
 Sheila Kelly (Melissa McCarthy) – April 6, 2013
 90's Dating Tips (Cecily Strong, Kate McKinnon) – April 6, 2013

2013–2014

 Bruce Chandling (Kyle Mooney) – September 28, 2013
 Cinema Classics (Kenan Thompson) – September 28, 2013
 Mornin' Miami! (Bobby Moynihan, Kate McKinnon, Vanessa Bayer) – October 5, 2013
 Miss Meadows (poetry teacher) (Vanessa Bayer) – October 5, 2013
 Inside SoCal (Kyle Mooney, Beck Bennett, Bobby Moynihan) – October 5, 2013
 Miley tapes (Miley Cyrus, Kyle Mooney) – October 5, 2013
 Shallon (Nasim Pedrad) – October 26, 2013
 Holiday Food – October 26, 2013
 Heshy Farahat (Nasim Pedrad, Mike O'Brien) – November 2, 2013
 Waking up with Kimye (Nasim Pedrad, Jay Pharoah) – November 16, 2013
 Jebidiah Atkinson (Taran Killam) – November 16, 2013
 Mr. Patterson (Baby Boss) (Beck Bennett) – November 23, 2013
 Animal Hospital (Vet Office) (Cecily Strong, Kate McKinnon) – November 23, 2013
 Family Feud (Kenan Thompson) – December 21, 2013
 Melanie (Aidy Bryant) – January 18, 2014
 Tonkerbell (Aidy Bryant) – March 1, 2014
 Black Jeopardy (Jay Pharoah, Kenan Thompson, Sasheer Zamata) – March 29, 2014
 Chris Fitzpatrick (Kyle Mooney) – March 29, 2014
 Leslie Jones (Leslie Jones) – May 3, 2014
 Whiskers R We (Kate McKinnon) – May 10, 2014

2014–2015

 Hollywood Game Night (Kate McKinnon) – October 11, 2014
 How 2 Dance With Janelle (Sasheer Zamata, Kyle Mooney, Jay Pharoah) – November 1, 2014
 High School Theater Show (Aidy Bryant, Beck Bennett, Kyle Mooney, Taran Killam, Kate McKinnon, Vanessa Bayer, Kenan Thompson) – November 22, 2014
 Cathy Anne (Cecily Strong) – December 6, 2014
 Right Side of the Bed! (Taran Killam, Cecily Strong) – December 13, 2014
 A One-Dimensional Female Character from a Male-Driven Comedy (Cecily Strong) – December 13, 2014
 Treece Henderson and his band (Kenan Thompson, Kyle Mooney) – December 13, 2014
 Willie (Kenan Thompson) – December 20, 2014
 Frida Santini (Kate McKinnon) – January 17, 2015
 Hunk (Cecily Strong, Kate McKinnon, Aidy Bryant) – January 24, 2015
 Riblet (Bobby Moynihan) – January 24, 2015
 Totino's lady (Vanessa Bayer) – January 31, 2015
 Brother 2 Brother (Chris Hemsworth, Taran Killam) – March 7, 2015
 The House (Beck Bennett, Kyle Mooney) – March 7, 2015
 Gerard, a former acting coach on The Jeffersons (Kenan Thompson) – March 7, 2015
 Gemma (Cecily Strong) – March 28, 2015
 The Janet Johnson-Luna Civil Trial (Pete Davidson, Cecily Strong) – April 11, 2015
 Kinky Elves (Vanessa Bayer, Kenan Thompson) – May 16, 2015

2015–2016

2016–2017

 Debette Goldry (Kate McKinnon) – October 1, 2016
 Action 9 News at Five (Beck Bennett, Cecily Strong, Mikey Day, Leslie Jones) – October 1, 2016
 Matt Schatt (Mikey Day, Kenan Thompson, Beck Bennett) – October 1, 2016
 Melania Moments (Cecily Strong) – October 1, 2016
 David S. Pumpkins (Tom Hanks) – October 22, 2016
 Leslie & Kyle love story (Leslie Jones, Kyle Mooney, Colin Jost) – November 12, 2016
 Posters (Emma Stone, Pete Davidson, Mikey Day) – December 3, 2016
 Pete Davidson's First Impressions (Pete Davidson) – January 14, 2017
 Dirty Talk (Melissa Villaseñor) – January 21, 2017
 The Duncans (Mikey Day, Leslie Jones) – February 11, 2017
 Guy Who Just Bought A Boat (Alex Moffat) – February 11, 2017
 Eric and Donald Trump Jr. (Mikey Day, Alex Moffat) – March 4, 2017
 Dog Translator (Scarlett Johansson, Kyle Mooney, Mikey Day, Cecily Strong, Alex Moffat) – March 11, 2017
 Dawn Lazarus (Vanessa Bayer) – May 6, 2017
 Morning Joe (Alex Moffat, Kate McKinnon, Mikey Day) – May 6, 2017

2017–2018

Marketing Campaign (Cecily Strong, Mikey Day) – September 30, 2017
Fresh Takes (Mikey Day, Alex Moffat, Kate McKinnon) – November 4, 2017
Angel, Every Boxer's Girlfriend from Every Movie About Boxing Ever (Heidi Gardner) – November 4, 2017
Lazlo Holmes (Chance the Rapper) – November 18, 2017
Sexual Harassment Charlie (Kenan Thompson, Beck Bennett, Mikey Day, Cecily Strong) – December 9, 2017
Cousin Mandy (Heidi Gardner) – December 9, 2017
The Science Room (Mikey Day, Cecily Strong) – January 13, 2018
Dog Head Man (Mikey Day) – January 13, 2018
Bailey Gismert (Heidi Gardner) – January 27, 2018
Dinner Discussion (Aidy Bryant, Heidi Gardner, Kate McKinnon, Kenan Thompson) – January 27, 2018
Big Nick's (John Mulaney, Pete Davidson, Chris Redd, Kenan Thompson, Cecily Strong, Kate McKinnon) – April 14, 2018
Mattel Instagram Pitch (Kenan Thompson, Cecily Strong, Pete Davidson, Heidi Gardner) – May 5, 2018

2018–2019

Thirsty Cops (Ego Nwodim, Kate McKinnon) - October 13, 2018
Deidre (Heidi Gardner) – October 13, 2018
Baskin Johns (Heidi Gardner) – October 13, 2018
Brothers (Beck Bennett, Kyle Mooney, Cecily Strong, Kenan Thompson, Aidy Bryant) – November 10, 2018
The War in Words (Mikey Day) – December 1, 2018
Jules, Who Sees Things a Little Differently (Beck Bennett) – December 1, 2018
Them Trumps (Kenan Thompson, Leslie Jones, Ego Nwodim, Chris Redd) – December 8, 2018
Travel Expert Carrie Krum (Aidy Bryant) – December 8, 2018
Name Change Office (Mikey Day, Pete Davidson) – January 19, 2019
Nico Slobkin and Brie Bacardi (Mikey Day, Heidi Gardner) – February 9, 2019
Ultimate Baking Championship (Alex Moffat, Heidi Gardner, Kyle Mooney, Aidy Bryant, Beck Bennett, Ego Nwodim) – February 16, 2019
Supercentenarian Mort Fellner (Mikey Day) – February 16, 2019
Line Dancing (John Mulaney, Ego Nwodim, Kenan Thompson) – March 2, 2019
Smokery Farms (Kate McKinnon, Aidy Bryant) – March 2, 2019
Henriette and Nan (Kate McKinnon, Aidy Bryant) – March 9, 2019
Terry Fink (Alex Moffat) – April 6, 2019
What's Wrong with This Picture? (Kenan Thompson, Aidy Bryant) – May 18, 2019

2019–2020

Chen Biao (Bowen Yang) – October 5, 2019
Instructor Auditions (Ego Nwodim, Bowen Yang, Cecily Strong, Heidi Gardner) – October 12, 2019
Sisters and the Soldier (Kate McKinnon, Aidy Bryant, Beck Bennett) – December 7, 2019
Baby Yoda (Kyle Mooney) – December 14, 2019
Sleepover Incident (Kate McKinnon, Aidy Bryant, Heidi Gardner, Melissa Villaseñor, Ego Nwodim, Chloe Fineman) – January 25, 2020
Uncle Meme (John Mulaney, Pete Davidson) – February 29, 2020
 MasterClass Quarantine Edition (Chloe Fineman) – April 11, 2020

2020–2021

2021–2022

References

Lists of recurring Saturday Night Live characters and sketches